Elisabeth Cebrián Scheurer (born 7 February 1971) is a Spanish former basketball player who competed in the 1992 Summer Olympics and in the 2004 Summer Olympics. She was part of the squad which became European champions in Perugia in 1993.

She is one of the players with the most appearances in the Spanish national team with 252 caps.

Nowadays, Cebrián works for FIBA Europe as member of the Women's Basketball Commission.

Club career 
She made her debut in the Spanish league with Raventós Catasús at 16. As one of the most promising young players of her time, she got transferred to the Caja Toledo - BEX Banco Exterior project, with other young Spanish prospects in order to prepare for the 1992 Summer Olympics. She went on to play for some of the most important clubs in the Spanish league, like Costa Naranja, Universitari, and Celta Vigo, winning a total of five Spanish leagues and four Spanish cups.

She was one of the first foreign players to be signed to the newly formed WNBA, playing at New York Liberty in 1998.

National team 
She made her debut with Spain women's national basketball team at the age of 18. She played with the senior team for 15 years, from 1989 to 2004. She is one of the most capped players with a total of 252 caps and 7.8 PPG.  She participated in two Olympic Games (Barcelona 1992 and Athens 2004), three World Championships and five European Championships:

 6th 1988 FIBA Europe Under-18 Championship for Women (youth)
 5th 1989 FIBA Under-19 World Championship for Women (youth)
  1990 FIBA Europe Under-18 Championship for Women (youth)
 5th 1992 Summer Olympics
  1993 Eurobasket
 8th 1994 World Championship
 9th 1995 Eurobasket
 5th 1997 Eurobasket
 5th 1998 World Championship
  2001 Eurobasket
 5th 2002 World Championship
  2003 Eurobasket
 6th 2004 Summer Olympics

References

1971 births
Living people
Spanish women's basketball players
Olympic basketball players of Spain
Basketball players at the 1992 Summer Olympics
Basketball players at the 2004 Summer Olympics
Centers (basketball)